The 2001 Heineken Trophy was a tennis tournament played on grass courts in Rosmalen, 's-Hertogenbosch in the Netherlands that was part of the International Series of the 2001 ATP Tour and of Tier III of the 2001 WTA Tour. The tournament was held from June 18 through June 24, 2001.

Finals

Men's singles

 Lleyton Hewitt defeated  Guillermo Cañas 6–3, 6–4
 It was Hewitt's 3rd title of the year and the 11th of his career.

Women's singles

 Justine Henin defeated  Kim Clijsters 6–4, 3–6, 6–3
 It was Henin's 3rd title of the year and the 4th of her career.

Men's doubles

 Paul Haarhuis /  Sjeng Schalken defeated  Martin Damm /  Cyril Suk 6–4, 6–4
 It was Haarhuis' 2nd title of the year and the 53rd of his career. It was Schalken's 2nd title of the year and the 10th of his career.

Women's doubles

 Ruxandra Dragomir Ilie /  Nadia Petrova defeated  Kim Clijsters /  Miriam Oremans 7–6(7–5), 6–7(5–7), 6–4
 It was Dragomir Ilie's only title of the year and the 9th of her career. It was Petrova's 1st title of the year and the 1st of her career.

External links
 
 ATP Tournament Profile
 WTA Tournament Profile

Heineken Trophy
Heineken Trophy
Rosmalen Grass Court Championships
2001 in Dutch tennis